The 1928 Colgate football team was an American football team that represented Colgate University as an independent during the 1928 college football season. In it first season under head coach Earl Abell, Colgate compiled a 6–3 record and outscored opponents by a total of 175 to 107.

Schedule

References

Colgate
Colgate Raiders football seasons
Colgate football